Firby is a small village and civil parish in Hambleton district of North Yorkshire, England. The population of the parish was estimated at 30 in 2015. At the 2011 Census the population was included with the civil parish of Bedale, and not counted separately.

The manor was owned by Auduid before the Norman Conquest. By 1086, it was held by Count Alan who had many lands in the area and owned the manor of Bedale. Count Alan and his family owned the parish for over two centuries and by the late 14th century, it was in a different family name.

Firby was a liberty of Richmondshire, and within the bounds of East Hang wapentake in the North Riding of Yorkshire. It is now within Crakehall ward of Hambleton district. The gardens at Thorp Perrow lie just to the south of the village and are in the parish of Firby. Some names of places within Firby include: Firby Hall, Firby (Christ's) Hospital, John Clapham House, Firby Grange (a former subdivision of Jervaulx Abbey), Low Ash Bank and High Ash Bank, Mile House Farm and Manley Farm. Christ's Hospital was founded in 1608 and was originally four almshouses. The building is now Grade II listed.

Firby Hall, also Grade II listed, was built in 1788 by Colonel Thomas Coores who fought in the American War of Independence. He demolished much of the village to build the house and the  estate.

Firby was the origin of the surname Firby. The name of the village derives from a personal name (Frithi) and the suffix by, meaning village or farmstead.

References

External links

Villages in North Yorkshire
Civil parishes in North Yorkshire